The Whitworth Hospital was a general hospital on Morning Star Avenue in Grangegorman, Dublin, Ireland.

History
The facility was designed as a hospital for chronic patients of the House of Industry. The new hospital, which was named after the Charles Whitworth, 1st Earl Whitworth, Lord Lieutenant of Ireland, opened in 1816. East and West wings, designed by Carroll & Batchelor, were added in 1900. It close temporarily in April 1849 on account of its high running costs but was re-opened a few months later by order of George Villiers, 4th Earl of Clarendon, the then Lord Lieutenant of Ireland. It closed permanently in November 1987. In 2002 the building was acquired by the Irish Nurses and Midwives Organisation, which has converted it for use as a meeting, training and study centre.

References

Sources

Hospitals in Dublin (city)
1816 establishments in Ireland
Hospitals established in 1816
Defunct hospitals in the Republic of Ireland
1987 disestablishments in Ireland
Hospitals disestablished in 1987